Finkenhof was a house in Kurtatsch an der Weinstraße, South Tyrol, Italy. The majority of the house was destroyed in the first half of the 16th century, but a house wall and parlor still stands. The coat of arms of the Indermaur family is displayed on the wall above the balcony. The Indermaur owned Finkenhof around 1646. Prior to the Indermaur, Finkenhof was owned by Im Holz (1566). It later passed to Delmann von Angerburg in 1780, Josef Schweiggl from 1834, the Pomella in 1838, and the Maier in 1914.

References 

Buildings and structures in South Tyrol
Houses in Italy
In der Maur family residences
Ruins in Italy